Clam digging is a North American term for a common way to harvest clams (edible infaunal bivalve mollusks) from below the surface of the tidal sand flats or mud flats where they live.  It is done both recreationally (for enjoyment or as a source of food) and commercially (as a source of income).  Commercial digging in the U.S. and Canada is colloquially referred to as clamming, and is done by a clammer. 

Amateur clam digging is often done using a straight long-handled spading fork, or a spading shovel.   

Commercial clamming for quahog clams, and the larger surf clams (soup clams) is primarily done offshore, via mechanical dredging.  To harvest cultivated clam beds, aquaculturalists often use a much smaller version (hand pulled) from the offshore dredge.  Another form of commercial clamming is done from a flat-decked boat using a clamrake with a telescopic handle.  The head of these rakes have long tines attached to a "basket-like" cage in which the clams are collected.

In the Minas Basin area of Nova Scotia, digging for soft-shelled clams is usually done with a clam hack, a spading fork with its short handle bent perpendicularly away from the fork's head.  A digger typically uses the hack by grasping the spine of the prongs in one hand and the handle of the fork in the other to push the hack down into the mud, clay, or sand and then pull it up and towards him/herself.  This digging action opens up the substrate to expose the clams.  Those clams legally long enough ( in Nova Scotia) are then taken by hand and put into a peck-size (9 litre) bucket that is used to measure the volume of clams collected. 

The use of other tools is prohibited in some areas.

Another popular method for bay clamming is the use of specialized tongs from a boat. Operators use the long tongs to probe the sand for clams. Clam tongs appear very much like two clamrakes with teeth hinged like scissors.

Digging for razor clams using a clam shovel or tube is a family and recreational activity in Oregon and Washington state.

See also 
Clamdigger, a sculpture by Willem de Kooning
Clamdigger (train), a daily passenger train which ran along the Northeast Corridor during the 1970s
 Gathering seafood by hand

References

External links

Fishing industry
Clams
Recreational fishing